Ioannis Karyofyllis (born 1 January 1939) is a Greek sailor. He competed in the Finn event at the 1960 Summer Olympics.

References

External links
 

1939 births
Living people
Greek male sailors (sport)
Olympic sailors of Greece
Sailors at the 1960 Summer Olympics – Finn
Place of birth missing (living people)